Vermont Route 153 (VT 153) is a state highway in southwestern Vermont in the United States. VT 153 is entirely town-maintained and goes through Bennington and Rutland counties.

Route description 

VT 153 begins at the state line adjacent to Washington County, New York, where it connects to County Route 153 (CR 153, formerly New York State Route 153 or NY 153) in the Rupert Valley. The route heads to the northeast, passing through the village of West Rupert, which is located northeast of the Big Ridge, a  mountain. Route 153 progresses farther, passing Oak Hill and turning at an intersection with VT 315 at Meetinghouse Hill. Route 153 then heads northward, intersecting local roads and parallelling the state border. Highgo Hill is passed to the west, and is only accessible via Chef Clark Road.

Route 153 then edges closer to the state border, entering West Pawlet. There are a few connector roads to New York county roads and NY 22 on the other side of the border. Route 153 passes some of ponds and crosses the Mettawee River. The river parallels Route 153 for the rest of its length until its terminus at VT 30 in Pawlet. VT 149 is just to the north of this intersection.

History
The entirety of VT 153 was assigned in May 1961 to match up with the recently designated NY 153.

Major intersections

References

External links

153
Transportation in Bennington County, Vermont
Transportation in Rutland County, Vermont